Lisnadill is a hamlet, townland and civil parish in County Armagh, Northern Ireland. In the 2001 Census it had a population of 54 people. It lies about 3 miles south of Armagh and is within the Armagh City and District Council area.

Places of interest

People 
Frederick Francis Maude, born in Lisnadill on 20 December 1821, was an Irish recipient of the Victoria Cross.

Education 
Lisnadill Primary School

See also 
List of civil parishes of County Armagh

References 

NI Neighbourhood Information System
Drumconwell Ogham Stone

Villages in County Armagh
Townlands of County Armagh
Civil parishes of County Armagh